Babes in Toyland was an American punk rock band formed in Minneapolis, Minnesota in 1987. The band was formed by Oregon native Kat Bjelland (lead vocals and guitar), with Lori Barbero (drums) and Michelle Leon (bass), who was later replaced by Maureen Herman in 1992. Courtney Love had a very brief stint in the band in 1987 as a bass player, before being kicked out and forming Hole in 1989.

Between 1989 and 1995, Babes in Toyland released three studio albums; Spanking Machine (1990), the commercially successful Fontanelle (1992), and Nemesisters (1995), before becoming inactive in 1997 and eventually disbanding in 2001. While the band was inspirational to some performers in the riot grrrl movement in the Pacific Northwest, Babes in Toyland never associated themselves with the movement.

Studio albums

Extended plays

Live albums

Compilation albums

Singles

Chart positions

Other contributions

Videography

The best places to catch a Babes In Toyland video in the US was through various MTV outlets. The music videos for "Bruise Violet" and "Sweet '69" were Buzzworthy Clip Features, "Sweet '69" was the cheapest video ever made at the time to be played on the network. The music video for "Sweet '69" was made on a $5,000 budget. Beavis and Butthead episodes were another notable place to catch clips for "Ripe" and "Bruise Violet". 120 Minutes also played music videos by the band, they also guest hosted the show on July 9, 1995.

Music videos

Other videography

References

External links

Discographies of American artists